The 1984 NCAA Men's Division II Ice Hockey Tournament involved 8 schools playing in single-elimination play to determine the national champion of men's NCAA Division II college ice hockey.  A total of 6 games were played, hosted by Bemidji State.

Bemidji State, coached by Bob Peters, won the national title with a 14-4 two-game aggregate victory in the finals over Merrimack.

Joel Otto, of Bemidji State, was named the Most Outstanding Player and Drey Bradley, of Bemidji State, was the high scorer of the tournament with ten points (2 goals, 8 assists).

Qualifying teams

Tournament Bracket
Each round were two-game total-goals series played at the tournament host.

All-Tournament Team

G: Galen Nagle (Bemidji State)
D: Drey Bradley (Bemidji State)
D: Dave Jerome (Bemidji State)
F: Joel Otto (Bemidji State)
F: Eric Gager (Bemidji State)
F: Tony Del Gaizo (Merrimack)

External links

NCAA men's ice hockey championship
 
NCAA Men's Division II Ice Hockey Tournament
NCAA Division II men's ice hockey tournament